Centaurium davyi is a species of flowering plant in the gentian family known by the common name Davy's centaury.

Distribution
The plant is endemic to California, where it is known from the coastline around the San Francisco Bay Area and areas north, as well as from Santa Cruz Island, one of the Channel Islands.

It grows in moist coastal sage scrub habitats on bluffs and dunes, and in coastal woodlands.

Description
Centaurium davyi is an annual herb not exceeding about 25 centimeters in height, with oval leaves under 2 centimeters long.

The inflorescence is a small, open array of flowers, some on very short pedicels. Each flower has generally five overlapping corolla lobes, each only a few millimeters in length, usually pink or partially pink in color.

References

External links

Jepson Manual Treatment of Centaurium davyi
Centaurium davyi — U.C. Photo gallery

davyi
Endemic flora of California
Natural history of the California chaparral and woodlands
Natural history of the California Coast Ranges
Natural history of the Channel Islands of California
Natural history of the San Francisco Bay Area